Macreupoca is a genus of moths of the family Crambidae.

Species
Macreupoca penai Munroe, 1964
Macreupoca spectralis

References

Natural History Museum Lepidoptera genus database

Glaphyriinae
Crambidae genera
Taxa named by Eugene G. Munroe